The red-necked tanager (Tangara cyanocephala) is a species of bird in the family Thraupidae.

It is found in Brazil, Argentina, and Paraguay. Its natural habitats are subtropical or tropical moist lowland forest and heavily degraded former forest.

Taxonomy and systematics 
The red-necked tanager was first described by Philipp Müller in 1776 as Tanagra cyanocephala.

There are three recognised subspecies of the red-necked tanager:

 T. c. cearensis Cory 1916
 T. c. corallina (Berlepsch 1903
 T. c. cyanocephala (Müller 1776)

Description 
It is mostly green with a black back and a blue head and throat.

References

Tangara (genus)
Birds of the Atlantic Forest
Birds described in 1776
Taxonomy articles created by Polbot